Richard H. Robinson (born May 17, 1943 in Birmingham, Alabama) is an American Marine Corps veteran of the Vietnam War era. He is also a California politician and a member of the Democratic Party.

Robinson was director of Operation Drug Prevention of Orange County when he ran for California State Assembly in 1974. He defeated 6-term incumbent John Quimby in the Democratic primary and then went on to easily beat his Republican opponent, University of Southern California football and National Football League (NFL) veteran Marlin McKeever.

He easily won reelection in 1976, 1978 and 1980 and would go on to serve as Majority Caucus Chair from 1982-84.

Running in a redrawn district in 1982, Robinson won reelection with 56.2% of the vote over Republican Dick Longshore who managed 43.8%.  Longshore ran against Robinson again in 1984 and this time, with Ronald Reagan at the top of the ticket, scored 49.8% of the vote.

This prompted Robinson to abandon reelection in 1986 and instead run for congress against Rep. Bob Dornan (R-Santa Ana), who had ousted Democratic incumbent Jerry M. Patterson two years earlier. Dornan beat Robinson by almost 13 points after a bruising, million dollar campaign.

In the race for Robinson's now open assembly seat Longshore defeated the Democratic candidate, then Santa Ana mayor Daniel E. Griset by just over 10 points.

Electoral history

References

External links
Join California Richard H. Robinson

1943 births
Living people
Politicians from Birmingham, Alabama
United States Marine Corps officers
20th-century American politicians
United States Marine Corps personnel of the Vietnam War
Democratic Party members of the California State Assembly